Vanishing may refer to:

Entertainment 
Vanishing, a type of magical effect.

Mathematics 

 The mathematical concept, see root of a function

Music 

 A song from the A Perfect Circle album Thirteenth Step
 A song from Mariah Carey (album)
 A song by Bryan Adams from Waking Up the Neighbours
 A song by Barenaked Ladies from Barenaked Ladies Are Me

Art and literature 
 A Void, 1969 French novel, also translated under the titles A Vanishing and Vanish'd
 Vanishing (2022 film), a French-South Korean film
 The Vanishing (disambiguation), various films and novels

See also 
Vanish (disambiguation)